Methionine aminopeptidase 1 is an enzyme that in humans is encoded by the METAP1 gene.

References

Further reading

External links 
 PDBe-KB provides an overview of all the structure information available in the PDB for Human Methionine aminopeptidase 1

EC 3.4.11